Aristomenis (Meni) Tsirbas is a film director, producer, writer, editor, animator, concept designer, storyboard artist, and visual effects supervisor. He has directed two feature films, several national television commercials, music videos, and short films. Meni's films have received over two dozen international awards from film festivals such as Sundance, Hollywood, and Palm Springs. He is president of MeniThings Productions

Background 

Meni was born in Montreal, Canada where he majored in film production at Concordia University. After directing commercials at his Montreal company, Trimension, Meni moved to Los Angeles in 1996 to work as a CG artist on James Cameron’s Titanic (1997 film) and national advertising spots for Nike, 7UP and Coca-Cola. He then rose to VFX supervisor for Miramax’s A Wrinkle in Time, Disney's My Favorite Martian and Paramount’s Star Trek: Deep Space Nine.

In 1999, Tsirbas returned to directing full-time with a string of award winning short films, game cinematics, and music videos including SIGGRAPH’s Ray Tracey in Full Tilt, Microsoft’s Mech Warrior: Vengeance, Terra, and The Freak, before embarking on his first feature film, Battle for Terra.

Meni followed up with two more short films, Anthro and Exoids at DAVE School and Gnomon School of Visual Effects respectively, before joining Blur Studio in 2012, where he directed a dozen national American television spots for Goldfish Crackers.

In 2019 Tsirbas directed his second feature, Timescape (2022 film), which was released in 2022.

Feature films 

 Battle for Terra (2007) (Writer, Director)
 Timescape (2022 film) (Screenwriter, Editor, Director)

Short films 

 Ray Tracey in Full Tilt (2000) (Writer, Director, Animator)
 MechWarrior 4: Vengeance - Opening Cinematic (2000) (Director)
 The Freak (2001) (Writer, Director, Animator)
 Terra (2002) (Writer, Director, Animator)
 Plus Minus (2010) (Co-Director)
 Exoids (2012) (Writer, Director)

Commercials 

 E.T. ID for MusiquePlus (1996) (Writer, Director, Animator)
 Montreal International Auto Show Theatrical Commercial (1996) (Writer, Director, Animator)
 Virtual Andre (1997) (Concept Designer, Animator)
 Taco Bell Mario Kart 64 (1998) (Storyboard Artist, Concept Designer, Camera, Animator)
 Goldfish: The Thing (2017) (Director)
 Goldfish: Selfies (2017) (Director)
 Goldfish: Spinny Spinny Spin Spin (2018) (Director)
 Goldfish: Comic Book (2018) (Director)
 Goldfish: Brooke Ball (2018) (Director)
 Goldfish: The Internet (2018) (director)

Music videos 

 Tears For Fears: Closets Thing to Heaven (Concept Design, VFX Director)
 Udora: Fade Away (Director)

Visual Effects 

 Star Trek: Voyager (TV series) (1995) (Digital Artist)
 Titanic (1997) (Feature film) (Digital Artist)
 Star Trek: Deep Space Nine (TV series) (1999) (Visual Effects Supervisor, Station X)
 My Favorite Martian (Feature Film) (1999) (Visual Effects Supervisor, Station X Studios)
 Dogma (film) (Digital Creative Director, Station X Studios)
 A Wrinkle in Time (2003 film) (Visual Effects Supervisor, MeniThings)

Awards 

 1997 Clio Award, Silver Clio - Animation, Nike Virtual Andre
 2001 New York International Independent Film & Video Festival, Best Animation, Ray Tracey in Full Tilt
 2002 The Hollywood Film Awards, Best Animated Short, The Freak
 2002 Palm Springs International ShortFest, Jury Award, The Freak
 2002 One Reel Film Fest, Best Animated Film, The Freak 
 2002 IFCT, Best Use of Computer Animated Imagery, The Freak 
 2003 Sundance Film Festival, Honorable Mention, The Freak
 2003 San Francisco IFF Golden Gate Award, The Freak
 2003 Malibu Film Festival, Audience Choice Award, The Freak
 2003 Black Maria Film Festival, Directors Choice, The Freak 
 2003 Festival Du Cinema De Paris, Best Director, The Freak
 2003 Philadelphia Film Festival, Best Short, The Freak
 2003 Hong Kong Film Fest, Best Animated Film, Terra
 2003 Palm Springs International ShortFest, Audience Award, Terra 
 2003 Ulisses Film Festival, Best Animated Film, The Freak
 2003 Cinanima, Best Animation Direction, Terra
 2004 Anima, First Prize, The Freak
 2004 AIFF, Audience Award, The Freak
 2004 Black Maria Film Festival, Directors Choice, Terra 
 2004 San Diego Film Festival, Audience Award Best Short, Terra
 2007 Tehran International Film Festival, Grand Prix, Battle For Terra 
 2008 Giffoni Film Festival, Silver Gryphon Award, Battle For Terra
 2008 Heartland International Film Festival, Crystal Heart Award, Battle For Terra
 2008 Ottawa International Animation Festival, Best Animated Feature, Battle For Terra

References

External links 

 
 MeniThings.com

1967 births
American film directors
American film producers
American animators
Canadian animated film directors
Canadian animated film producers
American animated film directors
American animated film producers
Film producers from Quebec
Artists from Montreal
Film directors from Montreal
Living people